Bilal Velija (born 22 October 1982) is a North Macedonia former professional footballer who played as a defender.

Career 
Velija joined Olimpik Baku during the 2008 winter transfer window, helping them finish second in the 2007–08 season before leaving the club in June 2008.

In March 2009, Velija signed a two-year contract with Løv-Ham of the Adeccoligaen. Velija's time in Norway came to an end in 2010, when Løv-Ham decided to return to a semi-professional club, therefore releasing their full-time players, which included Velija.

In February 2014, Velija went on trial with Veikkausliiga side VPS, playing for them twice in the League Cup before returning to Gostivar. In April of the same year, Velija signed a six-month contract with Finnish Second Tier side JJK.

Velija joined Musan Salama of the Finnish third tier Kakkonen in 2015.

Career statistics

References

External links

1982 births
Living people
People from Vrapčište Municipality
Albanian footballers from North Macedonia
Association football defenders
Macedonian footballers
Macedonian First Football League players
Azerbaijan Premier League players
Kategoria Superiore players
Norwegian First Division players
Ykkönen players
Kakkonen players
KF Shkëndija players
Porin Palloilijat players
AZAL PFK players
Besa Kavajë players
Løv-Ham Fotball players
FK Renova players
KF Gostivari players
JJK Jyväskylä players
Musan Salama players
Macedonian expatriate footballers
Macedonian expatriate sportspeople in Azerbaijan
Expatriate footballers in Azerbaijan
Macedonian expatriate sportspeople in Albania
Expatriate footballers in Albania
Macedonian expatriate sportspeople in Norway
Expatriate footballers in Norway
Macedonian expatriate sportspeople in Finland
Expatriate footballers in Finland